Poor Fork may refer to:
Cumberland, Kentucky, formerly named "Poor Fork"
Poor Fork (Cumberland River)